David T. Haberly is Professor of Portuguese at the University of Virginia. He holds an AB, MA, and PhD from Harvard University. He is a specialist on Brazilian literature and culture, but also has wide-ranging comparative interests in the nineteenth-century literatures of Latin America, the United States, and Spain.

Background
Haberly's father, Loyd Haberly, was a noted poet, printer, and educator.

Published works
Haberly's publications on Brazilian literature include Three Sad Races: Racial Identity and National Consciousness in Brazilian Literature (Cambridge University Press, 1983); editorial work, introduction, and two chapters for the third volume of the Cambridge History of Latin American Literature (Cambridge University Press, 1997); and editing Quincas Borba, a novel by Machado de Assis (Oxford University Press, 1999).

He has also written articles on a number of North American writers, including Washington Irving, James Fenimore Cooper, Nathaniel Hawthorne, and Caroline Howard Gilman.

References 

Year of birth missing (living people)
Latin Americanists
University of Virginia faculty
Harvard University alumni
Living people
Linguists from the United States